Luigi di Canossa SJ (20 April 1809 – 12 March 1900) was an Italian Cardinal of the Roman Catholic Church who served as Bishop of Verona from 1861 until his death, and was elevated to the cardinalate in 1877.

Biography
Born in Verona, he was the son of marquess Bonifacio di Canossa and Francesca de' Castiglioni. In 1837 he entered in the Society of Jesus and was ordained priest in 1841. From 1847 he lived in Milan.

In January 1861, he was appointed Bishop of Verona by Pope Pius IX, who created him Cardinal-Priest of San Marcello in 1877.

References

External links and additional sources
 (for Chronology of Bishops)
 (for Chronology of Bishops)
Catholic-Hierarchy 
Cardinals of the Holy Roman Church

1809 births
1900 deaths
19th-century Italian cardinals
Cardinals created by Pope Pius IX
19th-century Italian Roman Catholic bishops
19th-century Italian Jesuits
Bishops of Verona